Stivian Janku (born 23 June 1997) is an Albanian footballer who currently plays for Bylis in the Kategoria e Parë.

Club career

Luftëtari Gjirokastër
Janku made his Albanian Superliga debut on 20 November 2017 in a 1-1 home draw with KF Laçi. He was subbed on for Eri Lamçja in the 85th minute.

Bylis Ballsh (loan)
In August 2018, Janku was loaned out to Albanian First Division club KF Bylis Ballsh. He made his league debut for the club on 3 November 2018 in a 2-1 away victory over Tomori Berat, coming on as a 66th minute substitute for Odirah Ntephe.

References

External links
Profile at Football Database
Profile at UEFA.com

1997 births
Living people
Association football defenders
Albanian footballers
FK Partizani Tirana players
Luftëtari Gjirokastër players
KF Bylis Ballsh players
Kategoria e Parë players
Kategoria Superiore players
Footballers from Ioannina
Albania international footballers